Marsh Run is a tributary of Coles Creek in Luzerne County and Columbia County, in Pennsylvania, in the United States. Wild trout reproduce throughout the stream. It is named after marshes, which can be found in the vicinity of the stream. Alluvium and Wisconsinian Outwash area also present, as is bedrock consisting of sandstone and shale. The stream has one unnamed tributary.

Course
Marsh Run begins in a small pond in western Fairmount Township, Luzerne County. It flows west for several tenths of a mile, passing through a wetland and crossing Hynick Road. Almost immediately after crossing Hynick Road, the stream exits Luzerne County. Upon exiting Luzerne County, it enters Sugarloaf Township, Columbia County. The stream continues flowing west, receiving an unnamed tributary from the right after a short distance. A short distance further downstream, it reaches its confluence with Coles Creek.

Geography and geology
The stream is relatively small and has marshes along it.

For most of its length, Marsh Run flows over a glacial till known as the Wisconsinian Till. However, the stream's lower reaches are on alluvium and Wisconsinan Outwash. The former contains stratified sand, silt, and gravel, while the latter contains stratified sand and gravel. Bedrock consisting of sandstone and shale is also present in the vicinity of the stream. A wetland is located in its upper reaches.

Watershed and biology
The stream is entirely in the United States Geological Survey quadrangle of Red Rock. It is located in the northeastern portion of Sugarloaf Township.

Wild trout naturally reproduce in Marsh Run throughout between its headwaters and its mouth.

History and etymology
Marsh Run was entered into the Geographic Names Information System on August 2, 1979. Its identifier in the Geographic Names Information System is 1180455.

Marsh Run is named for the fact that marshes are located along it.

See also
Chimneystack Run, next tributary of Coles Creek going upstream
Ashelman Run, next tributary of Coles Creek going downstream
List of tributaries of Fishing Creek (North Branch Susquehanna River)

References

Rivers of Columbia County, Pennsylvania
Rivers of Luzerne County, Pennsylvania
Tributaries of Fishing Creek (North Branch Susquehanna River)
Rivers of Pennsylvania